São Carlos (Saint Charles, in English, ; named after Saint Charles Borromeo) is a Brazilian municipality in the interior of the state of São Paulo, 254 kilometers from the city of São Paulo. With a population of 254,484 inhabitants, it is the 13th largest city in the state in terms of the number of residents, being almost in the center of the state of São Paulo. The municipality is formed by the headquarters and the districts of Água Vermelha, Bela Vista São-Carlense, Santa Eudóxia and Vila Nery.

The city is an important regional industrial center, with the economy based on industrial activities and farming, such as the production of sugar cane, orange, milk and chicken. Served by road and rail systems, São Carlos houses several multinational companies. Given local and, in some ways, regional needs, there is a network of commerce and services distributed in street stores, convenience stores and a mall of the Iguatemi network. In the field of research, besides the universities, two centers of technical development of Embrapa are present in the municipality. São Carlos is the first city in South America in numbers of doctors per inhabitant, according to a survey done since 2006 by UFSCar. In all, there are 1,700 PhDs, which represents one for every 135 inhabitants. In Brazil, the ratio is one PhD per 5423 inhabitants.

The city is home to several public higher education institutions, such as the Federal University of São Carlos (UFSCar), two campi of the University of São Paulo (USP), the Federal Institute of São Paulo (IFSP) and FATEC, as well as a private higher education institution. This makes intense the university activity in the city, which affects the population count. For this reason, São Carlos has a floating population of more than twenty-nine thousand graduates and graduate students, mostly from other cities and states.

History
The region started to be settled in the end of the 18th century, with the opening of a road that led to the gold mines in Cuiabá and Goiás. Leaving from Piracicaba, passing through Rio Claro, the hills, fields and by typical vegetations of the Brazilian countryside, settlers established in the region. São Carlos' history started in 1831, when the "Pinhal" (Pines) allotment was demarcated.

On the city's foundation date, 4 November 1857, the population resided in some houses around the chapel and the inhabitants were mostly Arruda Botelho's family heirs, who were the first owners of the "Pinhal" allotments. Between 1831 and 1857 the pioneer coffee farms were formed, starting the first economic activity in the city. The coffee crops came to the "Pinhal" farm in 1840 and spread throughout the fertile lands around, becoming the main export item. The city foundation is credited to Antônio Carlos de Arruda Botelho, Count of Pinhal, an influent farmer and entrepreneur.

São Carlos was elevated to village in 1865, when a "Câmara", or ruling chamber, was created. In 1874, the village had 6,897 inhabitants, as a humble highlight of its fast growth and regional importance. It became a city in 1880 and in 1886, with a population of 16,104, its urban structure was settled.

The city arises on the coffee crops expansion context, which is relevant to the last two decades of the 19th century and to the first two of the 20th century. The arrival of the railway in 1884 provided an efficient system to transport the coffee production to the Santos harbor and boosted the economy of the region. The railway also contributed to the political and economic consolidation of the central area of the city.

When slavery ended, government created incentives to bring in immigrants. São Carlos had already received German nationals brought by the Count of Pinhal in 1876. Between 1880 and 1904, the city was one of the most important immigration centers in São Paulo state, the majority of them being Italians – specifically, Northern Italians. They worked in coffee plantations and in manufacturing factories, as well as trading activities.

In the beginning of the 20th century, countless cultural societies developed social activities aiming to promote literacy. Vittorio Emanuele Society in 1900 and Dante Alighieri in 1902 were but a few of them. The Italian presence was so significant that during the first half of the 20th century, the Italian government had a consulate branch in São Carlos.

With the Wall Street crash of 1929, coffee production went through a crisis, which made many immigrants leave rural areas for factories, wood artifact production, pottery, and construction.

Farmers had already applied the profits obtained with coffee in the constitution of several types of companies in São Carlos: banks, electricity, cable cars, telephones, water pumps, sewers, theaters, hospitals and schools.  This established a foundation for industrialization in the city. With the arrival of immigrants from other urban centers from the 1930s – 1940s, their expertise was used to consolidate industrialization as the main economic activity in the city. Its peak years were the 1950s, when São Carlos became a manufacturing center, with relevant industrial expression in São Paulo state.

The industrial sector also developed through workshops that incorporated the coffee industry. The manufacture of processing machinery, shoes, fertilizers, hardware, furniture, pasta, cigars, as well as activities such as tailory, breweries, foundries, sawmills, weaving, pottery and pencil production expanded the economy of São Carlos in the 1930s. In the 1950s and 1960s, with the expansion of refrigeration, new factories of machinery and tractors arrived. Numerous small- and medium-sized companies which provided products and services were also established.

In the second half of the 20th century, the city received a boost of technological and higher educational development when in 1953 the Escola de Engenharia de São Carlos, or the Engineering School of the University of São Paulo, was created. In the 1970s, the Federal University of São Carlos was launched.

Geography

The city is the center of a microregion with 308,777 inhabitants.

Its altitude is over 856 m. Most of the year the city is windy and sunny, with hot temperatures during all the year.

Geology 
The municipality is included in the geomorphological province of the Basaltic and sandstone slopes, between the provinces of the Western Plateau (to the north) and the Paulista Periférica Depression (to the south). In São Carlos, included in the Paraná Basin, outcrops are found of the following geological formations: Bauru (Bauru Group), on the back of the slopes (Planalto de São Carlos), where the largest portion of the urban nucleus, further north; Serra Geral (São Bento Group), in the narrow region of slopes where relief occurs (slopes); Botucatu (São Bento Group), which contains the lower part of the slopes, further south, besides including the Guarani Aquifer. The soil of the municipality consists mainly of, in descending order: red-yellow latosol (LV); purple latosol (LR); deep quartz sand (AQ); dark red latosol (LE); structured purple earth (ET); only lithographic (Li); hydromorphic soil (Hi) and Podzolic soil (PV).

Vegetation 
The original vegetation of the municipality, and the respective remnants, correspond respectively to: forest cerrado (cerradão, 16% and 2%); savanna (cerrado s.s., campo cerrado, campo campo) and campo (humid clean field); 27% and 2%); Atlantic Forest in the interior (semi-deciduous and riparian forests, 54% and 1%); Araucaria forest (semideciduous forest with araucaria, 1% and 0%) and capoeiras (degraded forests, 0% and 1%). Currently, much of the vegetation has been replaced by silvicultural plantations, Pastures and forestry. It should be remembered that, in the meantime, the proportions indicated above, partly obtained from interpretations of satellite images, have some uncertainty due to the difficulty of differentiating artificial grasses from natural clean fields. In a general view the savanna of Brazil.

In 2020 and 2021 the city was recognized in the international Urban Forest program "Tree Cities of the World"  organized by the Food and Agriculture Organization of the United Nations (FAO/UN). According to the Ph.D. Urban Forester Daniel Caiche, this recognition promotes cities committed to planning and managing the Urban Forest.

Hydrography 
The municipality is inserted between two Hydrographic Units of Water Resources Management (UGRHI): No. 9, Mogi-Guaçu, and No. 13, Tietê-Jacaré. The urban area is mainly located in the catchment area of the Monjolinho river, included, serially, in the Jacaré-Guaçu, Tietê, Paraná and La Plata river basins. The urban area is cut by the rivers Monjolinho, Gregório and Santa Maria do Leme, and the streams Tijuco Preto, Simeão, Agua Quente and Água Fria, among others. The basin of the Mojiguaçu river, which has the Quilombo river, Araras stream, Cabaceiras stream, Guabirobas stream, Jararaca stream, Água Branca stream, Brejo Grande stream or Água Vermelha stream, Matinha stream, Negro stream, Pântano stream, stream Waterfall.

The basin of the Jacaré-Guaçu river, which has the Monjolinho river, Feijão stream, Cã Cã stream, and Sour Orange stream. The basin of the Monjolinho river, which counts with the stream Santa Maria Magdalena (or stream Santa Maria do Leme), stream of the Jockey Club, stream Espraiado, stream Federal, stream Belvedere, stream Bridge of Tábua, stream Alto Monjolinho, stream Mineirinho, creek Santa Fé, Paraíso stream, Tijuco Preto stream, Gregório stream, Botafogo stream, Medeiros stream, Água Quente stream and Água Fria stream.

The Gregório stream basin, which tarts in a rural area to the east of the city in approximately 900 meters of altitude (where the Monjolinho river and the Negro river are born, important water courses of this municipality). It has as tributaries by the right bank the First Water stream near SP-310 before the Gregorio stream crosses the highway, Sorregotti stream near Educativa; Lazarini stream near Major Manuel Antonio de Matos Street, Biquinha stream in Visconde de Inhaúma Street (and on the left bank the Simeão stream in the (canalized) market region, and runs westward for approximately 7 km, where it flows into the Monjolinho river, near the shopping center.

Environment 
Part of São Carlos is included in the Corumbataí Environmental Protection Area (APA). Other conservation units are nearby: Itirapina Ecological Station (EE), EE Mata do Jacaré, and EE Jataí. In rural areas, there are also fragments of important native vegetation in some private legal reserves (LR), such as Fazenda Canchim, by Embrapa. The city presents a percentage of regularized properties for LRs, above the average calculated for the state.

As for the Permanent Preservation Areas (PPAs) of the rivers, many of those occurring in the urban area were irregularly occupied by marginal roads and buildings. However, little was done to compensate for the construction of these fringes, as well as to increase the minimum proportion of permeable area in adjacent plots. In addition, many rivers have been rectified or channeled, which are now considered inadequate. These factors, together, are determinant for the occurrence of floods in the city's lowlands.

The urban afforestation of the urban road network is diverse, but in quantitative terms, the number of trees is still very low, and many have conflicts with surrounding public facilities, such as aerial wiring and paving. As for pollution, the municipality has about two dozen areas contaminated, in particular, by waste from fuel stations, and dumps and landfills

Climate
According to the Köppen Climate Classification, the city has a tropical climate Aw with dry winter and hot months

According to data from the National Institute of Meteorology (INMET), since 1961 the lowest temperature recorded in São Carlos (conventional station of UFSCar) was 0,9 °C on 17 July 2000, and the highest reached 38.7 °C on 7 October 2020. The largest accumulated precipitation in 24 hours was 143.1 mm on 13 February 1980. The lowest relative air humidity index was 10%, recorded on 13 September 2010, 6 September 2011 and 16 September 2017 of that month.

Economy
The city has an active industrial profile with important national and international industries and certain agricultural importance, backed by technologies developed by Embrapa, owner of two research complexes in the city. Due to its increasing number of high technology industries, the city has been proclaimed "The National Capital of Technology" by Brazilian President Dilma Rousseff in 2011.

The city hosts several locally-grown technology-based companies, such as Opto Eletrônicos, and factories of multinational corporations such as Faber Castell, Electrolux, Husqvarna, Tecumseh and the Brazilian plant of Volkswagen engines, and national corporations such as TAM MRO – Technology Center, Toalhas São Carlos, Tapetes São Carlos, Papel São Carlos, Prominas Brasil and Latina.

The economic basis of São Carlos is the tertiary sector. Commerce and services corresponds to 65.9% of the city's GDP. Industry is also relevant. With 32.3% of the economy, the secondary sector has a bigger participation than the state of São Paulo's average. The primary sector corresponds to 1.7% of the GDP.

Culture

São Carlos is home to two Universidade de São Paulo campuses and the Universidade Federal de São Carlos (UFSCar), two of the most important higher learning centers in Brazil. Moreover, another minor and private university, Centro Universitário Central Paulista (UNICEP), is also based in São Carlos, and community colleges like SENAI, SESI, SESC, SENAC and the Escola Técnica Estadual Paulino Botelho. This has turned São Carlos into a university-oriented town, with an abundance of student-focused commercial establishments. It is also known for its student parties.

São Carlos' cultural life is marked by a young audience that enjoys musical concerts of Brazilian contemporary alternative artists that usually include the city in their tours. Also, São Carlos has 3 theaters and 7 commercial movie-theaters rooms.

There are two important events celebrated every year in the city, the Climate Party, which happens in April and has a traditional Orchid Exposition which features a craftwork fair and several food barracks. An Oktobertech fest is held yearly along with the São Carlos High Tech Fair (Fealtec).

The TAM Airlines Wings of a Dream Museum (Museu TAM) was in São Carlos,  from central São Carlos.

Transportation

Roads
SP-310 – Rodovia Washington Luís – 244 km to São Paulo
SP-318 – Rodovia Eng. Thales de Lorena Peixoto Junior – 116 km to Ribeirão Preto
SP-215 – Rodovia Luís Augusto de Oliveira and Rodovia Dr. Paulo Lauro e Dep. Vicente Botta

Air
The city is served by Mário Pereira Lopes International Airport, where one of the maintenance bases of TAM Airlines is located and well as the air and space TAM Museum, owned and maintained by the company. (Closest main airport that operates regular flights is RibeirÃo Preto Airport – about 90 km away.)

Notable people
Born in São Carlos:

Fábio Aurélio, Liverpool F.C. full-back
Nenê, former NBA player
Maurren Maggi,  track and field athlete and 2008 Olympic gold medallist
Gatti (Rafael Savério Gatti), former Brazilian football player
Ronald Golias, actor and comedian
Thiago Silva, UFC fighter
Izabel Goulart, supermodel
Sara Winter, former radical feminist activist

Twin towns – sister cities
 Coimbra, Portugal (since 1970)
 Tecumseh, Michigan, United States (since 1997)
 Santa Clara, Cuba (since 2005)
 Santa Cruz, Rio Grande do Norte, Brazil

See also

 University of São Paulo – USP
 Federal University of São Carlos – UFSCar
 Rodovia Washington Luís
 São Carlos Airport
 GE Sãocarlense
 São Carlos FC
 Estádio Luís Augusto de Oliveira
 São Carlos Clube
 Estádio Paulista

References

External links
  City Hall's Official Website
  Fundação Sistema Estadual de Análise de Dados has further demographic data for São Carlos.
  Aeronautical Engineering Students Website
  Official Web Site Aeronautical Museum

Charles Borromeo
 
1857 establishments in Brazil
Populated places established in 1857
High-technology business districts